Tilo Jung (born October 21, 1985) is a German journalist and chief editor of the political webshow Jung & Naiv (Young & Naive).

Life and career 
At the age of 15, Jung began to contribute as a freelance reporter to the regional daily newspaper Nordkurier on topics which included the year he spent as an exchange school pupil in Texas.  

In 2006, he moved to Berlin, enrolling to study business and law at Humboldt University, but he did not graduate. In 2011, he started his career as a journalist interviewing and editing coverage for the radio show Medienmagazin on radioeins, hosted by Rundfunk Berlin-Brandenburg.

Initially, Jung published uncut interviews on his YouTube channel. The German commercial television station Joiz.Germany began to broadcast episodes of Jung & Naiv six months later, but stopped in November 2014 when the station became insolvent. Notable guests on Jung's show were politicians, journalists and other commentators, including Peer Steinbrück, Jürgen Trittin, Heiko Maas, Jeremy Scahill, Noam Chomsky, and Glenn Greenwald.

In 2015, Jung shifted his focus to the Bundespressekonferenzen, the regular press conferences of the German government. In mid-April, he began to post shorter, topic-related videos excerpted from his full-length videos on YouTube. He also began a collaborative effort with Stefan Schulz, a journalist from the Frankfurter Allgemeine Zeitung. Other journalists and television programs, such as the heute-show and NDR's Zapp Magazin, have interviewed Jung or broadcast segments of his programs. Jung works independently and is supported by his web viewers through crowdfunding.

Awards 
2014: Grimme Online Award category Best Information

References

External links 

 Official Website
 YouTube: Tilo Jung

German journalists
German television talk show hosts
German podcasters
People from Malchin
Humboldt University of Berlin alumni
1985 births
Living people